The first season of RuPaul's Drag Race premiered in the United States on February 2, 2009, on Logo. Nine contestants were selected to compete in the running of becoming "America's Next Drag Superstar." The first season was filmed during the summer of 2008. The winner of the first season won a cash prize of $20,000, $5,000 worth of MAC Cosmetics, was featured in an LA Eyeworks campaign, and joined the Logo Drag Race tour. One of the nine contestants to compete on RuPaul's Drag Race, Nina Flowers was determined by an audience vote via the show's official website to be the season's Miss Congeniality. The results were announced in early September 2008.

The theme song playing during the runway every episode was "Cover Girl" from RuPaul's album Champion. This season and season one of All Stars are the only seasons to not feature the "Snatch Game".

The winner of the first season of RuPaul's Drag Race was BeBe Zahara Benet, with Nina Flowers as the runner-up. 

In late 2013, Logo re-aired the first season, which was titled RuPaul's Drag Race: The Lost Season, and featured commentary from RuPaul.

Contestants 

Ages, names, and cities stated are at time of filming.

Contestant progress

Lip syncs
Legend:

Guest judges
Listed in chronological order:
Bob Mackie, fashion designer
Mike Ruiz, photographer
Frank Gatson, director and choreographer 
Michelle Williams, singer and actress
Howard Bragman, writer and lecturer
Debra Wilson, actress and comedian
Gordon Espinet, make-up artist
Jenny Shimizu, model and actress
Lucy Lawless, actress and singer
Robin Antin, dancer, choreographer, and actress
Jeffrey Moran, Absolut Vodka marketing/branding executive
María Conchita Alonso, singer-songwriter and actress

Episodes

References

External links

  (U.S.)
 

2009 American television seasons
RuPaul's Drag Race seasons
2009 in LGBT history